Javier Rodríguez Nebreda (born 26 March 1974), commonly known as Javi Rodríguez, is a Spanish futsal player who plays for Baku United as a winger.

He was named the 2005 Futsal Player of the Year by Futsal Planet.

Honours
3 Leagues (1999/00, 2000/01, 2010/11)
1 Supercopa de España (2004)
2 Copa del Rey (2011, 2012)
1 Spanish Cup (2011)
1 European Clubs Tournament (2001)
3 UEFA Futsal Cups (2002, 2003, 2012)
2 FIFA Futsal World Cup (2000, 2004)
1 runner FIFA Futsal World Cup (2008)
4 UEFA Futsal Championship (2001, 2005, 2007, 2010)
1 Silver Ball (World Cup China Taipei 2004)
1 LNFS MVP (2001)

References

External links
LNFS profile

1974 births
Living people
Sportspeople from Barcelona
Spanish men's futsal players
FC Barcelona Futsal players
Playas de Castellón FS players
Baku United FC players
Spanish futsal coaches